"Wonderful! Wonderful!" is a 1956 popular music song by Sherman Edwards and Ben Raleigh.

Wonderful Wonderful may also refer to:

Wonderful! Wonderful! (album), a 2012 album by Joey DeFrancesco
Wonderful, Wonderful (Johnny Mathis album), 1957
Wonderful Wonderful (The Killers album), 2017
"Wonderful Wonderful" (The Killers song)
"Wonderful Wonderful" (Weeds), a 2009 episode